The women's road race of the 2008 UCI Road World Championships cycling event took place on 27 September in Varese, Italy. The course comprised eight laps around a 17.35-kilometre route, making a total distance of 138.8 km. Each lap featured two ascents: the first at Montello (6.5% gradient for 1.15 kilometres); and the second at Ronchi, Gallarate (4.5% for 3.13 kilometres). The race included a total of 1,937 metres of climbing.

Pre-race favourites included Varese local rider Noemi Cantele and her teammates Tatiana Guderzo and Giorgia Bronzini, Marianne Vos of the Netherlands, Judith Arndt of Germany (champion in 2004), reigning Olympic champion Nicole Cooke and silver medallist Emma Johansson. Notably missing from the start list was Marta Bastianelli, reigning champion from 2007, who was awaiting a verdict on a non-negative drug test result in July 2008.

The race was won by Great Britain's Nicole Cooke, with Marianne Vos and Judith Arndt finishing with the same time, second and third respectively. Cooke was the first British woman to win the race since Mandy Jones in 1982.

The race
Not long after the race began, a Swedish rider brought down the front row of the peloton when her tyres slipped on some painted letters on the road. Christine Thorburn was also brought down in a crash, when she was squeezed up against a fence. Although she was not severely injured and did attempt to chase the bunch, she failed to make contact and did not finish.

A group of thirteen riders soon broke away from the main group, driven mainly by the American Kristin Armstrong. They gained 25 seconds on the field but were pulled back by the Dutch and British teams with one lap to go. As soon as the break was caught, Marianne Vos launched a counter-attack on the Montello climb, Nicole Cooke, Judith Arndt, Trixi Worrack and Emma Johansson, and Susanne Ljungskog joined her in what was to become the winning break. Ljungskog's chances ended when she punctured, leaving five in the break.

Worrack and Vos attacked on the final hill, but were brought back to the break with 2 km to go. The race finished with a sprint, Vos took the lead before being overtaken by Cooke just before the finish line. Arndt struggled to match their speed in the sprint, she was nearly caught out by a late surge by Johansson, but eventually crossed the line in third place.

Final classification

Did not finish
45 riders failed to finish the race. Mayuko Hagiwara of Japan was disqualified, and Grassi Herrera of Mexico did not start the race.

References

External links
Varese 2008 home page

Women's Road Race
UCI Road World Championships – Women's road race
2008 in women's road cycling